INTI International University & Colleges are private university colleges located in Malaysia. The main campus was initially known as INTI University College until 31 May 2010 when the Higher Education Ministry announced its upgrade to university status. 

It is owned by INTI Education Group, which formalised its partnership with Laureate International Universities in 2008 and ended the partnership in 2020.

History
The college was opened in 1986 in Brickfields, Kuala Lumpur. The college only enrolled 37 students at its inception, but the student population increased to 400 within 18 months. Enrollment continues to increase, causing the college to be re-located to Jalan Sungai Besi in Kuala Lumpur in 1989.

Two years later, with more than 900 full-time students, the college established a permanent campus: INTI College Subang Jaya (ICSJ). It also opened branch campuses in Kuching, Sarawak, and Kota Kinabalu, Sabah, in 1991 and 1996, respectively. 

In March 2000, INTI acquired International College Penang, which is located in the Bukit Jambul education township. In 2004, INTI continued to expand with three new associate campuses: Genting INTI International College, Metropolitan College, and PJ College of Art & Design. To date, INTI has six associate campuses in Malaysia.

On 4 September 2006, INTI College Malaysia received approval from the Ministry of Higher Education for an upgrade to university college status and became INTI University College (INTI UC).

In 2008, INTI merged with Laureate International Universities to become a member of the Laureate International Education Group.

On 31 May 2010, the Ministry of Higher Education upgraded INTI University College to the status of a university, allowing it to confer its own degrees. INTI University College became INTI International University (IU).

On 1 June 2010, INTI University College received its upgrade to a full university from Higher Education Minister Datuk Seri Mohamed Khaled Nordin. Its student population was 300 at that time.

Campuses

INTI International University & Colleges have four campuses across Malaysia.
 INTI International University Nilai
 INTI International College Subang
 INTI International College Penang
 INTI College Sabah

Academic Programmes
The university and colleges are divided into faculties, each has its own pre-university, diploma and degree programmes.
 American Degree Transfer Program
 Biotechnology & Life Sciences
 Business
 Computing & IT
 Engineering
 Fashion Design
 Graphic Design
 Health Sciences
 Hospitality & Culinary Arts
 INTI English Language Programs
 Interior Design
 INTI Programmes for Working Professionals
 Mass Communication
 Multimedia Design
 Postgraduate Studies
 Pre-University Programmes
 Social Science

Transportation
INTI International University provides a charged bus service for students and staff to travel to different destinations according to the bus schedule they have prepared. Students and staff can use the bus service to travel to the Nilai Komuter station. They also provide a free-of-charge shuttle bus service to INTI International College Subang.

Recognition and Achievements

Additional photos

See also
 Education in Malaysia

References

External links 

Universities and colleges in Negeri Sembilan
Educational institutions established in 1986
1986 establishments in Malaysia
Business schools in Malaysia
Design schools in Malaysia
Hospitality schools in Malaysia
Information technology schools in Malaysia
Law schools in Malaysia
Medical schools in Malaysia
Private universities and colleges in Malaysia